Nicholas Ryan Swirad (born 28 May 1991) is an English professional footballer who plays as a centre-back for Malaysia Super League club Sri Pahang FC.

Club career
Swirad started his senior career with FC United of Manchester, making his debut at the age of 17 having played for the Manchester FA's youth and academy programme at Manchester College. He went on to play 17 matches for the club before representing several other clubs in the Manchester region including New Mills, Mossley, Ashton United and Stocksbridge Park Steels.

After playing in non-league football in England, he spent a year coaching at an academy in New Jersey, USA before joining NPL Tasmania side Northern Rangers in 2015, playing 16 matches and scoring 2 goals for the club in all competitions.

Johor Darul Ta'zim II
At the end of the 2015–16  season, Swirad left Northern Rangers to sign for Johor Darul Ta'zim II of the Malaysia Premier League, playing 22 games under coach Benjamin Mora and helping the team finish 3rd in the league standings.

Melaka United
On 12 June 2017, Swirad joined Super League team Melaka United on loan for the remainder of the 2017 season. There, he helped to maintain the club's Super League status under new coach Eduardo Almeida. In his 18 months at the club, he made 38 appearances, scoring 2 goals including a last minute winner against Selangor FA on the 21st of July, 2018.

PKNS 
Swirad joined Selangor based Super League side PKNS FC for the 2019 season under coach K Rajagobal. He scored 4 goals in 23 games for the team, earning an international call-up to the Malaysia national football team, in what was PKNS' final season as an independent Super League club.

Selangor 
After his selection to represent Selangor in their 1-0 win against Singapore FA in the 2019 Sultan of Selangor trophy  Swirad joined Selangor FA the following season under coach B. Sathianathan. However, he struggled with injuries making only 4 appearances for the club in a Covid-19 hit season that saw the league reduced to 11 from 22 matches only.

Nongbua Pitchaya 
On 1 January 2021, Swirad joined Thai Division 2 team Nongbua Pitchaya FC, looking to secure promotion to Thai League 1 on a short term deal.

In a month at the club, he played 4 games scoring the final goal of the season in a 3-0 win against Kasetsart FC, which confirmed the club as league champions.

He signed a contract extension with the club for the 2021-22 Thai League 1 season, but was unable to register due to visa restrictions requiring ASEAN imports to have made 3 international appearances.

Sri Pahang 
Unable to continue with Nongbua, Swirad signed for Sri Pahang FC on his 30th birthday, which was aired live on Astro Arena. He made his league debut for the club against Sabah in Kota Kinabalu, coming on for Ashar Al Aafiz Abdullah in the 83rd minute. His full debut was against JDT on the 27th of August 2021, in Johor Bahru, a performance which stamped his place in the first team for the remainder of season, including in the 2021 Malaysia Cup.

Swirad extended his contract with Sri Pahang until 2022, and went on to captain the team to their first win of the season against Penang FC.

International career
In March 2019, Swirad received his first call-up to the Malaysia national football team, but a groin injury prevented him from making his debut. Malaysia national team head coach Tan Cheng Hoe spoke highly of Swirad during his call-up.

“I’ve been monitoring him since last year, and to me, he is a quality player. He is versatile and able to play anywhere at the back. I hope to see him recover quickly and make his national debut as a centre back against Singapore.”

Nick received his second call-up to Harimau Malaya in 2022, ahead of the AFF Mitsubishi Electric Cup. However family issues prevented him from joining up with the main team during the first week of training camp and he was then placed on the standby list.

Career statistics

Club

Honour
Nongbua Pitchaya F.C.
 Thai League 2 Champions : 2020–21

Personal life 
Born in Manchester, Swirad's father is from England and his mother is a Chinese-descent from Malaysia. He also currently works for Malaysia’s Premier League broadcaster Astro Supersport. He hosted 2 seasons of Astro Supersport’s Man on the Street with co-host Reem Shahwa, where they connected local fans with ex-football legends including Dimitar Berbatov, Michael Owen, Henrik Larsson, Manu Petit and Jaap Stam.

Swirad used to work as a security guard at the Manchester Apollo in Ardwick whilst attending Manchester College nearby.

References

External links
 
 
 

1991 births
Living people
Malaysian footballers
Melaka United F.C. players
Johor Darul Ta'zim II F.C. players
English expatriate footballers
F.C. United of Manchester players
Rossendale United F.C. players
Mossley A.F.C. players
Ashton United F.C. players
New Mills A.F.C. players
Stocksbridge Park Steels F.C. players
Sri Pahang FC players
Malaysia Super League players
Association football central defenders
Footballers from Manchester
English people of Malaysian descent